Build the Martinique Country is a left-wing political party in the French département d'outre-mer of Martinique. It has one seat in the French National Assembly, held by Josette Manin.

References

Political parties in Martinique